Lesley Run is a stream in the U.S. state of Ohio.

Lesley Run was named after a man named Leslie who drowned in its waters.

See also
List of rivers of Ohio

References

Rivers of Montgomery County, Ohio
Rivers of Preble County, Ohio
Rivers of Ohio